On My Own is the fourth and final studio album released on August 26, 2003 by hip-hop artist, Magic on Koch Records. The album features production from Magic, Mark in da Dark and Sinista as well as guest appearances by Curren$y.

Prior to the release of this album, Magic had just left No Limit Records to join Koch and On My Own was his second 2003 album. However, this album was released just 5 months after his previous album White Eyes. This is Magic's final album prior to his death on March 1, 2013.

Commercial performance
On My Own reached No. 54 on the Billboard Top R&B/Hip-Hop Albums chart.

Track listing
"And It Starts" – 1:12  (feat. Mr B)
"Tear It Up" – 4:22  
"Do What U Do" – 2:50  
"Knock It Down" – 3:13  
"Wilyn'" – 3:04  
"Lala" – 0:29  
"International Gangstas" – 3:09  (feat. Curren$y)
"Wild Wayne" – 0:35  
"Ninth Ward" – 4:03  
"DJ Ro" – 0:27  
"We Give You" – 2:58  (feat. Trouble)
"So Tired" – 4:54  (feat. Trouble)
"Down Here" (Skit) – 0:33  
"Down Here" – 3:34  
"My Life" – 3:06  
"Time to Go" – 3:23  (feat. Da Bear)
"Short & Simple" (Skit) – 0:54  
"Short & Simple" – 3:26  (feat. Detroit)
"Ya'll Don't Really Want None" – 2:45  
"Detroit" – 0:12  
"All I Do" – 3:10

Charts

References

2003 albums
Magic (rapper) albums
E1 Music albums